"Bigroom Blitz" (also stylized as "Big Room Blitz") is the 2014 single by German musical group Scooter featuring American rapper Wiz Khalifa. It was released as the first single from their seventeenth album The Fifth Chapter. The song samples Turkish singer Sezen Aksu's song "Hadi Bakalım" from her 1991 studio album Gülümse. The vocals by Wiz Khalifa were cut from the 2013 song "Yoko" by Berner feat. Wiz Khalifa, Chris Brown and Big K.R.I.T. and were replaced on the re-release (by just "Scooter", not "feat. Wiz Khalifa") and the album with the vocals by Cosmo Hickox due to copyright violations. The track has become their first chart entry in France in 12 years, showing the most long-standing performance there since the release of "Move Your Ass!" in 1995.

Track listings
CD single (2-track)

Download

Download (Re-Release)

Charts

References

2014 singles
2014 songs
Scooter (band) songs
Wiz Khalifa songs
Songs written by H.P. Baxxter
Songs written by Jens Thele
Songs written by Michael Simon (DJ)